Baynazarovo (Baynazar) is a rural locality (a village) and the administrative centre of Baynazarovsky Selsoviet, Burzyansky District, Bashkortostan, Russia. The population was 1,313 as of 2010. There are 12 streets.

Geography 
Baynazarovo is located 29 km north of Starosubkhangulovo (the district's administrative centre) by road. Kurgashly is the nearest rural locality.

References 

Rural localities in Burzyansky District